Garnett Wesley Norman (January 1, 1900 – March 8, 1925), also known as "Garrett", and nicknamed "Bughouse", was an American Negro league outfielder in the 1920s.

A native of Chattanooga, Tennessee, Norman made his Negro leagues debut in 1923 with the Memphis Red Sox. He returned to Memphis in 1924, his final professional season. Norman died in Chattanooga in 1925 at age 25.

References

External links
 and Seamheads

1900 births
1925 deaths
Memphis Red Sox players
20th-century African-American sportspeople
Baseball outfielders